Zoran Tošić (born 28 April 1987) is a Serbian professional footballer who plays as a winger for Greek Super League club Lamia. He has built a reputation as a free-kick specialist and a tricky dribbler.

Tošić began his career with his local side Proleter Zrenjanin, before making his debuts with Mladost Lukićevo. He then joined Budućnost Banatski Dvor, who then merged with Proleter to form Banat Zrenjanin. A year later, he signed for Serbian giants Partizan, for whom he played for two years before a high-profile move to Manchester United of England. After he struggled to break into the Red Devils first-team, he was sent on a six-month loan to German side 1. FC Köln in January 2010, and was then transferred to CSKA Moscow of Russia that summer.

A full international between 2007 and 2016 , Tošić has earned 76 caps for Serbia. He was part of their teams at the 2008 Summer Olympics and the 2010 World Cup.

Club career

Early career
Born in Zrenjanin, SR Serbia, SFR Yugoslavia, Tošić began his football career with Mladost Lukićevo. After he terminated a contract with the club, he stayed without a club to play for a six-month period. He also played futsal with KMF SAS in the meantime. Later he moved to Budućnost Banatski Dvor, before the club merged with Proleter Zrenjanin to form Banat Zrenjanin. In 25 appearances for Banat in the 2006–07 Serbian SuperLiga campaign, Tošić scored two goals, and in doing so helped his team avoid relegation.

Tošić's performances both on the domestic scene with Banat and on the international scene with Serbia earned him glances from many clubs across Europe. On 6 August 2007, Tošić signed a four-year professional contract with Partizan. He made his Partizan debut in a 1–0 league win against Vojvodina at Stadion Karađorđe on 11 August, coming on as a 15th-minute substitute for injured Almami Moreira.

Manchester United
Tošić was subject to a successful work permit application as the player had not played the required 75% of his team's matches in the previous year. On 28 November, there were reports that Tošić had been granted a work permit, with the transfer expected to go through at the start of the transfer window. Despite claims that negotiations had stalled over Tošić's personal terms, the transfer was finalised on 2 January 2009, with both Tošić and his Partizan teammate Adem Ljajić joining United. Tošić was given the number 14 shirt.

Tošić received his first taste of first team football on 20 January 2009, when he was named on the bench for United's League Cup semi-final second leg at home to Derby County. He made his debut in an FA Cup Fourth round match against Tottenham Hotspur on 24 January 2009, when he came on as a 72nd-minute substitute for Cristiano Ronaldo. Tošić's league debut came three days later, on 27 January 2009, when he came on as a 77th-minute substitute for his friend Dimitar Berbatov in United's 5–0 win over West Bromwich Albion. Although he did not make many first team appearances in his first season at Manchester United, Tošić became a regular in the club's reserve team, helping the team to a second-place finish in the Premier Reserve League before scoring the winning goal in the final of the 2009 Manchester Senior Cup against Bolton Wanderers at the Reebok Stadium.

He scored his first senior goal for the club on 26 July 2009 in an 8–2 victory over Hangzhou Greentown during United's pre-season campaign in Asia.

In a Scottish newspaper interview in September 2012, Tošić stated that he regretted walking out on United.

Loan to 1. FC Köln
On 27 January 2010, Tošić joined 1. FC Köln on loan until the end of the 2009–10 season. He made his debut three days later, coming on as a substitute for Taner Yalçın in the 54th minute of Köln's 2–1 win away to Eintracht Frankfurt on 30 January. On 27 March 2010, Tošić scored his first two goals for Köln in his eighth appearance for them, in a 4–1 away win over Hannover 96. However, in his next league match a week later, he was sent off after two bookable offences in the space of 45 seconds, coming in a 3–0 home defeat at the hands of Hertha BSC. On 17 April 2010, after his one-game ban was over, Tošić returned to the squad and scored both goals in a 2–0 victory over VfL Bochum. After five months with Köln, he returned to Manchester United in June 2010.

CSKA Moscow

On 15 June 2010, Tošić was signed on a five-year contract by CSKA Moscow for an undisclosed fee, believed to be in the region of £8 million. 

On 15 August 2010, he scored his first goal for CSKA in a home match against Anzhi Makhachkala in the Russian Premier League. Four days later, in his European debut for the Russian side, he scored two goals in a UEFA Europa League match at home to Anorthosis Famagusta of Cyprus, CSKA winning 4–0. On 12 December 2010, Tošić scored his first goal in a UEFA Europa League group stage game in a 5–1 victory over Lausanne. On 17 March 2011, Tošić scored one more goal in Europa League, in return leg of Round of 16, against Porto at Estádio do Dragão.

The Serbian midfielder started CSKA's match on 22 May 2011, helping the club to a 2–1 win over Alania Vladikavkaz in the 2011 Russian Cup Final, before being substituted in the 83rd minute for Lithuanian defender Deividas Šemberas. Three days later, he netted the final goal of a 3–0 victory over Krylia Sovetov Samara after Keisuke Honda had given the visitors a 2–0 lead.

On 14 March 2012, Tošić scored a spectacular goal against Real Madrid at Santiago Bernabéu in 2nd leg of Round of 16 of UEFA Champions League.

Tošić opened the scoring against Spartak on 19 March 2012 as his side claimed a 2–1 victory thanks to a late Seydou Doumbia goal. He scored both goals on 28 April against city rivals Spartak Moscow, as CSKA again won 2–1 in front of 50,000 fans at the Luzhniki Stadium. He then scored two late goals against their other local rivals Lokomotiv Moscow on 2 May, propelling CSKA to a 3–1 victory on the penultimate matchday of the Championship Group of the Premier League season.

On 2 October 2013, Tošić scored a goal and made an assist in a 3–2 home victory over Viktoria Plzeň in UEFA Champions League. On 23 October 2013, in next round of UCL, Tošić scored a goal against Manchester City. Four days later, Tošić scored a hat-trick in a 5–1 league victory for CSKA over Krasnodar. Tošić scored the game's only goal as CSKA defeated rivals Lokomotiv on 15 May 2014 to secure a second successive Russian Premier League title.

On 23 July 2014, Tošić signed a new contract with CSKA until the end of the 2016–17 season, with Tošić leaving CSKA at the end of this contract on 5 July 2017.

Return to Partizan
On 28 August 2017, Tošić returned to Partizan on a three-year contract. On 9 September 2017, Tošić made his official re-debut for the club against Mladost Lučani. Eight days later, he scored the opener when his club beat Radnički Niš 3–1. On 20 October, he successfully converted the first penalty in his career, in 2–0 away victory over Radnik Surdulica. Nine days later, he missed the penalty in the 88th minute, but scored in the injury time from a free kick to give his team a 2–1 away victory over Borac Čačak. On 2 November, Tošić scored the opener from a free kick in a 2–0 home win over Skënderbeu Korçë in the fourth match of the 2017–18 UEFA Europa League group stage.

On 1 August 2019, Tošić scored the opener in a 3–0 home win over Connah's Quay Nomads in the UEFA Europa League qualifications. This was Partizan's 350th goal in Europe since the inaugural European Cup game in 1955. Tošić scored his first Eternal derby goal on 22 September 2019 in a 2–0 home win over rivals Red Star.

Tobol
On 16 April 2021, Tošić signed for FC Tobol on a contract until the end of the year. On 17 January 2023, Tobol announced that Tošić had left the club after his contract had expired.

International career
Tošić made his debut for the Serbia under-21 team on 23 March 2007, against Belgium. Four days later, against Portugal, he scored his first international goal. He also took part in Serbia's 2007 UEFA European Under-21 Championship campaign, in which they reached the final before losing out to the Netherlands.

On 31 August 2007, Tošić received his first call-up to the senior Serbia squad for the Euro 2008 qualifier against Finland and Portugal by national team manager Javier Clemente, and made his international debut in the Finland game. Tošić scored his first international goal on 12 August 2009 against South Africa in a friendly match. He scored twice in a 3–1 victory.

In June 2010, he was selected in Serbia's squad for the 2010 FIFA World Cup,  where he appeared in group stage match against Australia.

On 11 October 2014, Tošić scored an added-time equaliser for a 1–1 draw away to Armenia in UEFA Euro 2016 qualifying.

Career statistics

Club

International

Scores and results list Serbia's goal tally first, score column indicates score after each Tošić goal.

Honours
Partizan
Serbian SuperLiga: 2007–08, 2008–09
Serbian Cup: 2007–08, 2017–18, 2018–19

CSKA Moscow
Russian Premier League: 2012–13, 2013–14, 2015–16
Russian Cup: 2010–11, 2012–13
Russian Super Cup: 2014

Tobol
Kazakhstan Premier League: 2021
Kazakhstan Super Cup: 2022

Individual
List of 33 top players of the Russian league: 2012–13, 2013–14, 2014–15

References

External links

Zoran Tošić at Serbian National Team page
Zoran Tošić profile at CSKA website

1987 births
Living people
Sportspeople from Zrenjanin
Serbian footballers
Serbia youth international footballers
Serbia under-21 international footballers
Serbia international footballers
Association football wingers
2010 FIFA World Cup players
Olympic footballers of Serbia
Footballers at the 2008 Summer Olympics
FK Budućnost Banatski Dvor players
FK Banat Zrenjanin players
FK Partizan players
Manchester United F.C. players
1. FC Köln players
PFC CSKA Moscow players
Taizhou Yuanda F.C. players
FC Tobol players
PAS Lamia 1964 players
Serbian SuperLiga players
Premier League players
Bundesliga players
Russian Premier League players
China League One players
Kazakhstan Premier League players
Super League Greece players
Serbian expatriate footballers
Expatriate footballers in England
Expatriate footballers in Germany
Expatriate footballers in Russia
Expatriate footballers in China
Expatriate footballers in Kazakhstan
Expatriate footballers in Greece
Serbian expatriate sportspeople in England
Serbian expatriate sportspeople in Germany
Serbian expatriate sportspeople in Russia
Serbian expatriate sportspeople in China
Serbian expatriate sportspeople in Kazakhstan
Serbian expatriate sportspeople in Greece